Alfonso Andrés Obregón Cancino (born May 12, 1972) is a retired Ecuadorian football player.

Club career
Obregón spent the majority of his professional career with LDU Quito. He has made over 300 appearances in the defensive midfield position and captained the team for a number of years before ceding the position to Patricio Urrutia. He won five Serie A titles and the 2008 Copa Libertadores with los albos.

International career
At the international stage, Obregón earned 58 caps for the Ecuador national team between 1995 and 2004. His debut came on October 25, 1995, in a friendly against Bolivia. He would go on to form part of the squad that participated in the 2002 FIFA World Cup and played at the Copa América in 2001 and 2004. His last match came in the 2004 Copa América against Uruguay.

He currently serves as the sporting director for LDU Portoviejo in his hometown.

Honors
LDU Quito
Serie A: 1998, 1999, 2003, 2005 Apertura, 2007
Copa Libertadores: 2008

References

External links
Obregón's FEF Player Card

1972 births
Living people
People from Portoviejo
Association football midfielders
Ecuadorian footballers
C.D. ESPOLI footballers
L.D.U. Quito footballers
Delfín S.C. footballers
Ecuador international footballers
2001 Copa América players
2002 FIFA World Cup players
2002 CONCACAF Gold Cup players
2004 Copa América players